is a Japanese competitive swimmer who competes in backstroke events.  He is a Kindai University student in Osaka.

He won a silver medal in the 200 metre backstroke and a bronze in the 100 metre backstroke at the 2012 Summer Olympics, along with a silver in the men's 4 × 100 m medley with the Japanese team. His beautiful backstroke technique has often been compared to Roland Matthes, who was described as the Rolls-Royce of swimming.

Biography
He was born in Osaka and started his actual swimming career in his junior high school years. When he was in the second grade, future Olympic backstroke medalist Ryosuke Irie hated swimming. He loathed it so much that his mother had to carry a crying Irie to his coach at poolside.

When he first joined, Irie was one of the slowest swimmers in the elite Itoman Toshin swimming school in Suminoe Ward, Osaka. He joined the school because his older brother, Shinpei Irie, who had won numerous national-level competitions, was in the program. He reluctantly continued swimming only because his mother, Kumiko, promised she would ask the coach if he could quit a year after he joined the school.

Irie initially trained in freestyle, but began swimming the backstroke alone for long periods before and after practice. Backstroke was suitable for Irie because it did not require as much power as freestyle, and soon, Irie began winning national-level competitions and breaking junior high school records.

A year after Irie began training at the elite school, his mother had forgotten her promise to ask the coach if her son could quit.

In 2005 he won the national high school championships in 200 meter backstroke when he was a first year grade student. He made new high school student record in Japanese national championships in April 2006. He narrowly missed the entry for FINA World Aquatics Championships of that year. He won a gold medal with the time of 1:58.85 in 200 m backstroke at the 2006 Asian Games in Doha, Qatar.

In August 2007, he attended his first world swimming competition, International Swim Meet 2007 held in Chiba, Japan. On August 22, he beat the previous high school record in 100 m backstroke with the time of 54.07 s. The next day, he beat another high school record in 200 m backstroke with the time of 1:57.03.

World record controversy
He swam the 200 meter backstroke in a Japanese record time of 1:52.86 on May 10, 2009 in a Japan-Australia swimming contest held in Canberra. Even though the time was lower than the world record, his time was rejected by FINA, swimming's international governing body, because he did not wear an approved suit. Japan's swimming federation did approve the record, however, along with several others in which Japanese swimmers wore unapproved suits that were later ruled to yield an unfair advantage. Irie's time would have sliced a massive 1.08 seconds off the 200 meter record set by American Ryan Lochte when he won gold at the Beijing Olympics. The high-tech swimsuit, which is made by Japanese sport wear manufacture Descente (who owns Arena), was not approved by FINA in a meeting held on May 20, 2009, and was called for modifications along with other 136 models. In the same meet, he swam a time of 52.56, which was only 0.02 seconds off the world record of Aaron Peirsol, set at the Olympic Games the previous year. With an approved suit, Irie won the silver, Lochte the bronze and Aaron Peirsol won gold in the 200m backstroke at the 2009 World Aquatics Championships in Rome later that year. Irie's time of 1:52.51 was a new Asian record, and the second fastest in the history of 200m backstroke.

Swimming technique
Ryosuke Irie is credited with having the most graceful and effective backstroke technique in the world. Before, he did a lot of backstroke training with a water bottle on his head (Invented by East Carolina University Swim and Dive, 1990's), to ensure that his head is very steady, and to maintain the smoothness of his stroke. Irie has paid a lot of attention to achieving a perfect technique from a young age, which is why despite his small size in comparison to other world-class backstrokers, he can still attain great results. While he did not medal at the Rio 2016 games  his training continues as he hopes to win gold in his home country at the Tokyo 2020 Olympic Games.

Personal bests and records
Long course (50 m)

Short course (25 m)

References

External links

 
 

1990 births
Living people
Sportspeople from Osaka
Japanese male backstroke swimmers
Swimmers at the 2008 Summer Olympics
Swimmers at the 2012 Summer Olympics
Swimmers at the 2016 Summer Olympics
Swimmers at the 2020 Summer Olympics
Olympic swimmers of Japan
Olympic silver medalists for Japan
Olympic bronze medalists for Japan
Olympic silver medalists in swimming
Olympic bronze medalists in swimming
Medalists at the 2012 Summer Olympics
World Aquatics Championships medalists in swimming
Medalists at the FINA World Swimming Championships (25 m)
Asian Games medalists in swimming
Swimmers at the 2006 Asian Games
Swimmers at the 2010 Asian Games
Swimmers at the 2014 Asian Games
Swimmers at the 2018 Asian Games
Asian Games gold medalists for Japan
Asian Games silver medalists for Japan
Medalists at the 2006 Asian Games
Medalists at the 2010 Asian Games
Medalists at the 2014 Asian Games
Medalists at the 2018 Asian Games
Universiade medalists in swimming
Universiade gold medalists for Japan
Universiade silver medalists for Japan
Medalists at the 2009 Summer Universiade
Medalists at the 2011 Summer Universiade
21st-century Japanese people